The Owenmore River is a river in northwest County Mayo, Ireland. It is big spate river and drains a large area of bogs, moorland and mountains.

Course
The Owenmore River rises in the Nephin Beg Range, flowing first northwards to meet the Oweninny River, and continuing westwards through Bangor Erris before flowing out southwestwards through Tullaghan Bay into the Atlantic Ocean.

Wildlife

The Owenmore River is a noted salmon, grilse and trout fishery.

See also
Rivers of Ireland

References

Rivers of County Mayo